Windischmann is a German surname. Notable people with the surname include:

Karl Joseph Hieronymus Windischmann (1775–1839), German doctor, philosopher, and anthropologist
Liis Windischmann, Canadian model
Mike Windischmann (born 1965), American soccer player

German-language surnames